Kristin Lynne Haynie (born June 17, 1983) is an American former basketball player in the Women's National Basketball Association (WNBA) and current assistant coach for the Minnesota Lynx.

Early life
Haynie was raised in Mason, Michigan. In high school, she played on the varsity team since her freshman year, and graduated from Mason High School in 2001.

Career

Haynie was the starting point guard for the Michigan State University Spartans all four years. She was instrumental in their 2005 Big Ten Championship and first ever trip to the Final 4. During her senior year, the Michigan State Women's Basketball Team had an excellent season, capturing 33 wins (including beating powerhouse programs like UConn, Tennessee and Notre Dame). Michigan State finally fell to Baylor University in the National Championship game. Haynie is frequently mentioned in the Michigan State Women's Basketball Record Book. One of her most impressive accomplishments was being the first and only woman (until 2017) to complete a triple double (points, assists and steals) in the NCAA tournament.

Michigan State statistics

Source

WNBA career 
Haynie was drafted by the Sacramento Monarchs ninth overall in the 2005 WNBA draft. The Monarchs ended up winning the 2005 WNBA Championship in her rookie year.
She is the only player to have played in the NCAA finals as well as the WNBA finals in the same year. On February 6, 2008, Haynie was selected by the Atlanta Dream in their expansion draft.

She also played for Paleo Faliro in Greece during the 2008–09 WNBA off-season.

She returned to the Sacramento Monarchs after being traded from the Detroit Shock halfway through the 2009 season, and remained until the team was disbanded at the end of that season. Haynie was selected by the Washington Mystics in the dispersal draft, but never played a game in a Mystics uniform, and has not signed with another WNBA team since, though she continued to play professionally in Europe.

Post-playing career 
After completion of the 2012 professional season in Italy, Haynie was named a women's basketball assistant, coaching at Eastern Michigan University. After two seasons with the Eagles and developing a point guard of the year, she went into personal training. She trained for two months before CMU Head Coach Sue Guevara offered her a position on her staff. Haynie helped lead Central Michigan to 2015 and 2016 MAC West Championships. In 2016 her point guard, Presley Hudson, was awarded Freshman of the Year. In 2017 CMU won the regular season conference outright, with the point guard earning 1st Team all MAC honors. Haynie was the Michigan State University assistant women's basketball coach from 2018 to the end of the 2022-23 seaosn.

Haynie was inducted into the Michigan State University Athletic Hall of Fame in 2017.

Haynie became an assistant coach for the Minnesota Lynx of the WNBA in March of 2023.
|}

Personal life
Kristin has a wife and two children.

References

External links
Central Michigan bio

WNBA stats
Atlanta expansion draft/analysis

 

1983 births
Living people
American women's basketball coaches
American women's basketball players
American expatriate basketball people in Greece
American expatriate basketball people in Italy
American expatriate basketball people in Lithuania
American expatriate basketball people in Russia
Atlanta Dream players
Basketball coaches from Michigan
Basketball players from Michigan
Central Michigan Chippewas women's basketball coaches
Detroit Shock players
Eastern Michigan Eagles women's basketball coaches
Michigan State Spartans women's basketball players
Minnesota Lynx coaches
People from Mason, Michigan
Sacramento Monarchs players
Shooting guards